Men's middle distance cross-country classic skiing events at the 2006 Winter Paralympics were contested at Pragelato on 15 March.

There were 3 events, all of 10 km distance. Standings were decided by applying a disability factor to the actual times achieved.

Results

Visually impaired
The visually impaired event was won by Brian McKeever, representing .

Sitting
The sitting event was won by Taras Kryjanovski, representing .

Standing
The standing event was won by Steven Cook, representing .

References

M